Brian Leslie Butler (born 16 February 1948) is a Welsh former rugby union and professional rugby league footballer who played in the 1960s and 1970s.

Background
Brian Butler was born in Llanelli, Wales.

Rugby union career
Butler first came to prominence as a rugby union player when he represented Felinfoel. Like many other players before him, he moved from Feloinfoel to neighbouring Llanelli where he played as prop. In the 1967–68 season he was a regular in the first team, opposite Byron Gale with club captain Norman Gale completing the front row. Although never capped for the Wales national team he was selected to tour Argentina in 1968 as part of a select 'Wales XV'. Butler played against Argentina on 14 September at Buenos Aires; the Wales XV lost 9–5, no caps were awarded at the time, but he was later awarded a Welsh Rugby Union President's cap.

In June 1970 Butler, along with club-mate Stuart Gallacher switched to professional rugby league, joining Bradford Northern. This act severed his ties with rugby union and he never played the sport again.

Rugby league career

International honours
Brian Butler won caps for Wales (RL) while at Swinton in the 1975 Rugby League World Cup against France, New Zealand, and France, and while at Warrington in 1977 against France.

Club career
Brian Butler was transferred from Swinton to Warrington in exchange for David Chisnall, he made his début for Warrington on Sunday 12 October 1975, and he played his last match for Warrington on Sunday 20 March 1977.

References

External links
Photograph "Brian Butler, Llanelli forward, wins the ball back, 26th February 1968" at alamy.com
Photograph "Hutchinson goes in for a tackle - Young "A" team hooker, Kevin Hutchinson, goes in to make a tackle against St Helens. - 22/08/1970" at rlhp.co.uk
Photograph "Butler goes down - Brian Butler goes down to a double tackle against Hull KR. - 04/04/1971" at rlhp.co.uk
Photograph "Brian Butler Makes A Break - Brain Butler makes a break during todays game at Odsal - 24/12/1972" at rlhp.co.uk
Photograph "Brian Butler - Brian Butler hands off a Castleford opponent. - 30/04/1972" at rlhp.co.uk
Photograph "Seabourne leads his men - Barry Seabourne, acting skipper, leads his men out down the slope. - 01/10/1972" at rlhp.co.uk
Photograph "Brian Butler Breaks - Brian Butler breaks for the Rochdale line. - 16/04/1972" at rlhp.co.uk
Photograph "Brian Butler covered - Ex Northern prop Brian Butler is covered in the cup match at Station Road. - 24/02/1974" at rlhp.co.uk*(archived by web.archive.org) Statistics at wolvesplayers.thisiswarrington.co.uk
Search for "Brian Butler" at britishnewspaperarchive.co.uk

1948 births
Living people
Bradford Bulls players
Felinfoel RFC players
Footballers who switched code
Llanelli RFC players
Rugby league players from Llanelli
Rugby league props
Rugby union players from Llanelli
Rugby union props
Swinton Lions players
Wales national rugby league team players
Warrington Wolves players
Welsh rugby league players
Welsh rugby union players